Guntown  is a city in Lee County, Mississippi, located in the northern part of the Tupelo micropolitan area. The population was 2,410 at the 2020 Census.

Etymology 
Guntown is named for Virginia Loyalist émigré James G. Gunn (d. 1826) who found asylum among the Chickasaws in present-day Lee County.

History 
Union cavalry officers described Guntown as "a station and small village on the Mobile & Ohio road." The U.S. post office was established on April 13, 1866, marking the official launch of the service in Guntown. This was followed by incorporation on February 16, 1867, and appointment of the first mayor that year.

Geography 
Guntown is located along Mississippi Highway 145, with the older parts of the city lying further to the east near the railroad tracks.  U.S. Route 45 traverses the western part of the city, running roughly parallel to MS 145.  Baldwyn lies just to the north of Guntown, and Saltillo lies just to the south.

Demographics

2020 census

As of the 2020 United States Census, there were 2,410 people, 880 households, and 671 families residing in the town.

2000 census
As of the census of 2000, there were 1,183 people, 443 households, and 337 families residing in the city. The population density was 261.1 people per square mile (100.8/km). There were 482 housing units at an average density of 106.4 per square mile (41.1/km). The racial makeup of the city was 74.98% White, 24.18% African American, 0.34% Asian, 0.42% from other races, and 0.08% from two or more races. Hispanic or Latino of any race were 1.01% of the population.

There were 443 households, out of which 45.4% had children under the age of 18 living with them, 51.2% were married couples living together, 21.0% had a female householder with no husband present, and 23.9% were non-families. 22.8% of all households were made up of individuals, and 9.7% had someone living alone who was 65 years of age or older. The average household size was 2.67 and the average family size was 3.12.

In the city, the population was spread out, with 34.3% under the age of 18, 7.0% from 18 to 24, 28.6% from 25 to 44, 20.2% from 45 to 64, and 9.9% who were 65 years of age or older. The median age was 32 years. For every 100 females, there were 89.9 males. For every 100 females age 18 and over, there were 80.3 males.

The median income for a household in the city was $27,188, and the median income for a family was $29,783. Males had a median income of $27,868 versus $20,375 for females. The per capita income for the town was $12,456. About 19.3% of families and 24.7% of the population were below the poverty line, including 34.5% of those under age 18 and 17.9% of those age 65 or over.

Education 
Guntown is served by the Lee County School District.

Notable people
 Cornelius Augustus, baseball pitcher in the Negro leagues
 L. T. Kennedy, member of the Mississippi House of Representatives from 1918 to 1935
 Chad McMahan, member of the Mississippi Senate
 Esther Smith, gospel music singer

See also 
 Brices Cross Roads National Battlefield Site
 List of places named after people in the United States

References

External links

 Government
 
 General information
 
 
 Lee-Itawamba Library System
 

1866 establishments in Mississippi
Cities in Lee County, Mississippi
Cities in Mississippi
Cities in Tupelo micropolitan area
Populated places established in 1866